No, No, Nanette is a 1940 American film directed by Herbert Wilcox and based on both the 1919 stage play No, No, Nanette and the 1930 film No, No, Nanette. It was one of several films the British producer/director made with Anna Neagle (whom he married in 1943) for RKO studios in the U.S.

Plot
Personable Nanette helps her philandering millionaire uncle Jimmy out of several embarrassing situations with beautiful women he's promised careers to; and in the process, Nanette becomes romantically involved with both a musical comedy producer, and a young artist.

Cast 
Anna Neagle as Nanette
Richard Carlson as Tom Gillespie
Victor Mature as William Trainor
Roland Young as Mr. "Happy" Jimmy Smith
Helen Broderick as Mrs. Susan Smith
ZaSu Pitts as Pauline Hastings
Eve Arden as Kitty
Billy Gilbert as Styles
Tamara as Sonya
Stuart Robertson as Stillwater Jr. / Stillwater Sr.
Dorothea Kent as Betty
Aubrey Mather as Remington, the butler
Mary Gordon as Gertrude, the cook
Russell Hicks as "Hutch" Hutchinson

Production
Victor Mature was borrowed from Hal Roach.

Soundtrack 
 Anna Neagle – "No, No, Nanette" — Vincent Youmans (music) and Otto Harbach (lyrics)
 Anna Neagle and Roland Young – "I Want to Be Happy" — Vincent Youmans and Irving Caesar
 Tamara – "I Want To Be Happy"
 Eve Arden – "I Want To Be Happy"
 Sung by Anna Neagle and Richard Carlson – "I Want To Be Happy"
 Anna Neagle and Richard Carlson – "Tea For Two" — Vincent Youmans and Irving Caesar
 "Ochi Chornya" — Russian cabaret song, music derived from Florian Hermann's Valse Hommage, op. 21 (1879); lyrics by Yevhen Hrebinka, first published in Literaturnaya Gazeta (17 January 1843)

Reception

Box office
Although the film was popular, its cost meant it made a small loss of $2,000.

Critical
Variety wrote:
Musical comedies rarely have much story. That's all right. No one expects them to. Plot is compensated for in a hit tune show by good music. That's an elementary show business lesson taught in a class that producer Herbert Wilcox must have skipped. In making a film version of the 1925 Broadway hit ... Wilcox saves all the book but very little of the music. 'Tea for Two' and 'I Want to Be Happy', as well as the title tune, 'No, No, Nanette' have been reduced to virtually incidental music.
Even at that, Wilcox has been fortunate. Nanette has a pretty good plot as musical comedy plots go. He has erred, however, in complicating it instead of simplifying it, as was needed. Wilcox has been lavish, however, in instilling production values in Nanette and there's no denying, despite their age, the lilt of the Vincent Youmans tunes.

References

External links 

1940 films
1940s English-language films
American black-and-white films
1940 musical films
Films directed by Herbert Wilcox
Films based on musicals
American musical films
RKO Pictures films
1940s American films